Johanna Walpurgis of Leiningen-Westerburg (3 June 1647 – 4 November 1687), was a German noblewoman member of the House of Runkel (through female line surnamed Leiningen-Westerburg) and by marriage Duchess of Saxe-Weissenfels.

Born in Schaumburg an der Lahn, she was the third of nineteen children born from the marriage of Georg Wilhelm, Count of Leiningen-Westerburg in Schaumburg and Countess Sophia Elisabeth of Lippe-Detmold. From her eighteen older and younger siblings, eleven survive adulthood: Simon Philipp, Frederick William, Maria Christiana (by marriage Countess Reuss of Lobenstein), Sophia Magdalena (by marriage Countess of Schönburg-Hartenstein), John Anton, Christoph Christian, Johanna Elisabeth (by her two marriages Countess of Wied-Runkel and Metternich-Winneburg), Angelika Catherine (by marriage Countess of Vasaborg), Henry Christian Frederick Ernest, Georg II Charles Louis and Juliana Eleonore (by marriage Countess of Metternich-Winneburg).

Life

In Halle on 29 January 1672, Johanna Walpurgis married Augustus, Duke of Saxe-Weissenfels as his second wife. They had three children:
Frederick, Duke of Saxe-Weissenfels-Dahme (Halle, 20 November 1673 – Dahme, 16 April 1715).
Maurice (Halle, 5 January 1676 – Szeged, Hungary, 12 September 1695).
Stillborn son (1679).

Juliana Walpurgis died in Dahme aged 40, having survived her husband by seven years. She was buried in the Schlosskirche, Weissenfels.

References

|-
 

 

Johanna
Johanna
1647 births
1687 deaths
17th-century German women